A campus is the land on which an institution, either academic or non-academic, is located.

Campus may also refer to:

Campus (anime)
CAMPUS (database), a database of plastics properties
Campus (film), an Indian film
Campus (train), an American passenger train
Campus (TV series), a British sitcom television series
Campus novel, a genre of novel
Campus Party, a kind of LAN party
Campus radio, a radio station run by students of an educational institution
Campus Station (OC Transpo), a transit station in Ottawa, Canada
Campus university, a type of university in Britain
DWRT-FM, an FM-radio station in the Philippines, formerly known as "Campus 99.5"
Virtual campus, the online offerings of a college or university
 a climbing move, see Glossary of climbing terms

Places 
Campus, Illinois, a village in the United States
Campus, West Virginia
Campus Bay
Campus Geesseknäppchen, Luxembourg

People with the surname 
Filomena Campus, jazz singer, composer, lyricist and theatre director
Peter Campus (born 1937), American video artist